Charles Lyle may refer to:
 (Charles Ernest) Leonard Lyle, 1st Baron Lyle of Westbourne (1882–1954), British Conservative Party politician
 Charles Lyle, 2nd Baron Lyle of Westbourne (1905–1976), see Baron Lyle of Westbourne

See also
Charles Lyell (disambiguation)
Charles Lyall (disambiguation)